Hung Chi-chang (born 23 August 1951) is a Taiwanese politician. He was the Chairman of the Straits Exchange Foundation (SEF) from 12 July 2007 to 19 May 2008.

Political career
In September 1986, Hung and seventeen others founded the Democratic Progressive Party.

Legislative Yuan
Hung had served in the Legislative Yuan since 1990, and resigned his seat to chair the Straits Exchange Foundation.

Straits Exchange Foundation
During a provisional meeting on 12 July 2007, the board of directors and supervisors of the SEF elected Hung to be the chairman of the foundation. Hung express his feeling that upon his election, SEF would step up its services for Taiwanese businesses and people on both sides of the Taiwan Strait in the future. His appointment met with some oppositions from Taiwan independence advocates due to his support for a proposal to lift the 40% investment ceiling of book value for investments by Taiwan's enterprises in Mainland China.

Hung sought to be reelected to the legislature via the Democratic Progressive Party list in 2008, but failed to win a seat.

References

Democratic Progressive Party Members of the Legislative Yuan
1951 births
Living people
University of Toronto alumni
National Taiwan University alumni
Taipei Medical University alumni
Members of the 1st Legislative Yuan in Taiwan
Members of the 2nd Legislative Yuan
Members of the 3rd Legislative Yuan
Members of the 4th Legislative Yuan
Members of the 5th Legislative Yuan
Members of the 6th Legislative Yuan
Taiwanese political party founders